Homeobox protein Hox-B3 is a protein that in humans is encoded by the HOXB3 gene.

This gene is a member of the Antp homeobox family and encodes a nuclear protein with a homeobox DNA-binding domain. It is included in a cluster of homeobox B genes located on chromosome 17. The encoded protein functions as a sequence-specific transcription factor that is involved in development. Increased expression of this gene is associated with a distinct biologic subset of acute myeloid leukemia (AML).

See also
Homeobox

References

Further reading

External links 
 

Transcription factors